Eva Scott Fényes (1849-1930) was an American painter known for watercolor landscape of the American west. She was also known for her philanthropic activities.

Biography
Fényes was born on November 9th, 1849 in New York City as the only child of Leonard and Rebecca Briggs Scott. She attended Pelham Priory School, the first girls’ preparatory school in the New York area, where she receives her first art training. In 1868/69 she travels through Southern Europe and Northern Africa with her parents, spending six weeks in Egypt, where she receives art training from Sanford R. Gifford.

On November 19th, 1878 she married  Lieutenant William Sullivane Muse, US Marine Corps, Fort Monroe, Virginia, with whom she had one child, Leonora Scott Muse Curtin (1879-1972). In 1889 Eva and her daughter come to Santa Fe, New Mexico, to seek divorce. 

In 1895 she travels to Egypt again, where she meets her second husband, Hungarian nobleman Adalbert Fényes de Csokaly. They marry in Budapest in 1896 and return to the United States and settle in Pasadena.

Though never a professional artist, Fényes was an accomplished watercolorist. With the urging of Charles Fletcher Lummis she created over 300 landscapes which often included Southwest architecture features such as missions and adobe structures.

Soon after her second marriage, Fényes and her husband settled in Pasadena, California. She commissioned Robert D. Farquhar to design a house, known as the Fenyes Mansion, and now the home of the Pasadena Museum of History. Fényes was a member of the Landmarks Club of California, the Pasadena Music and Art Association, and the Southwest Society. She also served on the board of trustees of the Southwest Museum.

In 1926 Eva Scott Fényes, her daughter and granddaughter Leonora Paloheimo (1903-1999) built a home in Santa Fe, Acequia Madre House, that is now run by the Paloheimo Foundation and also home to the Women's International Study Center.

Fényes died in 1930. Her watercolors and sketchbooks are in the collections of the Autry Museum of the American West in Los Angeles, the Pasadena Museum of History and Acequia Madre House in Santa Fe.

Gallery

References

External links
 

1849 births
1930 deaths
19th-century American women artists
20th-century American women artists
Artists from New York City